Jeffrey Eatough (born June 2, 1963) is a Canadian former professional ice hockey right winger. He played one game in the National Hockey League with the Buffalo Sabres, on March 25, 1982 against the Boston Bruins. The rest of his career, which lasted from 1982 to 1988, was spent in various minor leagues. Internationally he played for the Canadian national junior team at the 1981 World Junior Championships.

Biography
As a youth, Eatough played in the 1976 Quebec International Pee-Wee Hockey Tournament with a minor ice hockey team from Toronto. 

Eatough was a star in the Ontario Hockey League, finishing seventh in the league with 53 goals in the 1981–82 season while playing for the Cornwall Royals.

He was drafted in the fourth round, 80th overall, by the Buffalo Sabres in the 1981 NHL Entry Draft. He played just one game in the National Hockey League with the Sabres as an 18-year-old during the 1981–82 season. He did not register a point.

Later in his career, he finished sixth in the Atlantic Coast Hockey League in scoring during the 1986–87 season, tallying 43 goals and 42 assists for the Mohawk Valley Comets.

Career statistics

Regular season and playoffs

International

See also
 List of players who played only one game in the NHL

References

External links

1963 births
Living people
All-American Hockey League players
Buffalo Sabres draft picks
Buffalo Sabres players
Canadian ice hockey right wingers
Cornwall Royals (OHL) players
Cornwall Royals (QMJHL) players
Flint Generals (IHL) players
Flint Spirits players
Mohawk Valley Comets players
Niagara Falls Flyers players
North Bay Centennials players
Rochester Americans players
Ice hockey people from Toronto